Sanda Yahanata is a 2000 Sri Lankan Sinhala adult drama film directed by Mohan Niyaz and produced by Anil Jayasooriya. It stars Sabeetha Perera and Sanath Gunathilake in lead roles along with Cletus Mendis and Palitha Silva. The film marked the debut cinema appearance of Paboda Sandeepani. Music composed by Sarath Wickrema. It is the 942nd Sri Lankan film in the Sinhala cinema.

The film has been shot entirely around Kandy.

Plot
Viveka is the Grama Sevaka of the village and is the eldest in a family of four girls. Jagath Hathurusinghe supports a politician in the area and he is interested in Viveka. But she resists his advances due to many reasons including differences in political ideology. She also personally dislikes him. But the reason for the girl's opposition to his entreaties are not understood.

The politician supported by Jagath. Jagath now basking in the rights of political power continues with his idea to even compel Viveka by force to agree to his proposal. Viveka has no power to fight against male dominance and political power of this society and all personal animosity against Jagath becomes ineffective. Her dreams to enter into a happy wedded life with the man she likes ends on her wedding day with the most pathetic experience in her life.

Would educated and headstrong Viveka be able to win her fight against male opposition and the political rivals. While the story continues the film ends in a tragedy.

Cast
 Sabeetha Perera as Viveka
 Sanath Gunathilake as Jagath Hathurusinghe
 Palitha Silva
 Cletus Mendis as Politician
 Roshan Pilapitiya
 Mahendra Perera
 Senaka Wijesinghe
 Paboda Sandeepani as Viveka's sister
 G. R. Perera as Farmer
 Geetha Kanthi Jayakody
 Lionel Wickrama
 Seetha Kumari
 Pradeep Hettiarachchi
 Sandun Wijesiri
 Eardley Wedamuni
 Sunil Premakumara

References

2000 films
2000s Sinhala-language films